Maya Ann Brady-Timmons is an American college softball player for the UCLA Bruins. As a freshman in 2020, she was named Softball America Freshman of the Year.

High school career
Brady attended Oaks Christian School in Westlake Village, California where she was a middle infielder and led the team to three Marmonte League titles and was a two-time league MVP. During her senior year, she had a .558 batting average with 12 home runs and 32 runs batted in (RBI). Following an outstanding season, she was named Marmonte League Most Valuable Player and All-CIF Southern section, as well as the Ventura County Star 2019 All-County Softball Player of the Year and Los Angeles Daily News Player of the Year. She was ranked the No. 2 recruit in the nation by FloSoftball and Softball America.

College career
Brady made her collegiate debut for UCLA Bruins in 2020. During the opening week of the season at the Stacy Winsberg Memorial Tournament, Brady was 9-for-18, with four home runs, nine RBI, and nine runs scored. She was subsequently named Pac-12 Freshman and Player of the Week for the week ending February 11, 2020. During her Freshman year she finished with a .356 batting average, .699 slugging percentage and led the team with seven home runs and tying for first with 28 RBI, tied for second with seven multiple-RBI games and tied for third with seven multi-hit games, and ranked third with 22 runs scored and 11 walks. Following the season that was cancelled due to the COVID-19 pandemic, she was named Softball America Freshman of the Year.

During her redshirt freshman year in 2021, she had a .333 batting average, six stolen bases, and nine multiple-RBI games. She tied for second with 13 home runs, third with 36 runs batted in, 31 runs scored and 19 walks. Following an outstanding season, she was named to the first team All-Pac-12, Pac-12 All-Freshman team and NFCA first team All-American.

To begin the 2023 season, Brady recorded 11 consecutive hits, setting a new UCLA program record, surpassing the previous record of 10 held by Stacey Nuveman (1999) and Lisa Fernandez (1993). She was subsequently named the NFCA National Player of the Week for the week ending February 14, 2023, after she went 13-for-16 with 14 RBI and four home runs in UCLA's season-opening Stacy Winsberg Memorial Tournament.

Personal life
Brady was born to Maureen Brady and Brian Timmons. Her mother was an All-American pitcher at Fresno State. She is the niece of former American football player Tom Brady and former Major League Baseball player Kevin Youkilis.

References

Living people
UCLA Bruins softball players
People from San Mateo, California
Softball players from California
Year of birth missing (living people)
Tom Brady
African-American sportswomen